Derri Derra is a rural locality in the North Burnett Region, Queensland, Australia. In the  Derri Derra had a population of 146 people.

History 
Derri Derra Provisional School opened on 7 March 1927. In 1951 it became Derri Derra State School. It closed on 6 August 1971. It was on the north-west corner of the junction of Mundubbera Durong Road and Back Derra Road.

Beeron Road Provisional School opened on 5 September 1927. In 1952 it became Beeron Road State School. It closed on 11 December 1987. It was at 1070 Beeron Road. The school grounds are used as a sports and recreation area under the control of the North Burnett Regional Council.

In the  Derri Derra had a population of 146 people.

Geography
The Burnett River forms part of the northern boundary. The Auburn River forms most of the western boundary before joining the Burnett in the north-west. The Boyne River forms the eastern boundary and most of the northern before also joining the Burnett.

Road infrastructure
The Mundubbera Durong Road (State Route 75) runs through from north to south.

References 

North Burnett Region
Localities in Queensland